Wake Me When the War Is Over is a 1969 American made-for-television comedy film directed by Gene Nelson and starring Ken Berry and Eva Gabor. It first aired as the ABC Movie of the Week on October 14, 1969.

Plot
The film tells the story of the amazingly naive and inept Lieutenant Roger Carrington (Berry) of the United States Army Air Forces beginning in January 1944 during World War II. After accidentally falling out of a C-47 when attempting to drop airborne leaflet propaganda, he lands in German territory. Escaping pursuing German soldiers, he is hidden by a local baroness named Marlene (Gabor). Luckily, Marlene is against the Nazis, and sympathizes with Carrington, taking him under her wing to recover, and eventually falling in love with him.

Unfortunately, when World War II ends, Marlene realizes that Carrington will leave when he finds this out. Not wanting him to go yet, she decides not to tell him about the war ending so he will stay, and she manages to keep him with her for nearly five years, explaining the Allies are continuously losing, then recapturing England. Around then is when Carrington convinces himself that it's his duty to continue fighting on a one man sabotage operation. He leaves Marlene's estate, not realizing he's now in a peacetime country. The only problem is, no one can tell him the war is over because no one around him speaks English including the Baroness' maid Eva who accompanies him.

Cast
 Ken Berry as Roger Carrington
 Eva Gabor as Baroness Marlene
 Werner Klemperer as Major Erich Mueller
 Danielle De Metz as Eva
 Hans Conried as Erhardt
 Jim Backus as Colonel
 Parley Baer as Erhardt's Butler
 Alan Hewitt as Koenig

See also
 Situation Hopeless... But Not Serious

References

External links
 
 
 

1969 television films
1969 films
1969 comedy films
American comedy television films
American World War II films
1960s English-language films
ABC Movie of the Week
Films directed by Gene Nelson
1960s American films